Marek Jerzy Łatas (born April 20, 1960 in Myślenice) is a Polish politician. He was elected to Sejm on September 25, 2005 getting 9549 votes in 12 Chrzanów district, candidating from Law and Justice list.

See also
Members of Polish Sejm 2005-2007

External links
Marek Jerzy Łatas - parliamentary page - includes declarations of interest, voting record, and transcripts of speeches.

1960 births
Living people
People from Myślenice
Members of the Polish Sejm 2005–2007
Law and Justice politicians
Members of the Polish Sejm 2007–2011
Members of the Polish Sejm 2011–2015
Polish schoolteachers
Solidarity Electoral Action politicians